Asperg is a town in the district of Ludwigsburg, Baden-Württemberg, Germany.

History

Asperg was established by the County Palatine of Tübingen, whose ruling house had a cadet named Asperg, around a preexisting castle. The town and castle were sold to the County of Württemberg in 1308, who granted Asperg town rights. In 1510, Ulrich, Duke of Württemberg gave Asperg Tübingen's town charter, and the town retained it until 1715.

Geography
Elevation above sea level in the municipal area ranges from a low of  Normalnull (NN) to a high of  NN.

Politics
Asperg has one borough, Asperg, and six villages: Altach, Hohenasperg, Lehenfeld, Osterholz, Schöckinger, and Silberhälden. The abandoned village of Weihenberg is also located in the municipal area.

Coat of arms
Asperg's coat of arms displays a green aspen tree growing out of a green, three-pointed hill and flanked by two black . The aspen tree references the name "Asperg", while the antlers are taken from coat of arms of Württemberg and have flanked the tree since the 19th century in local seals. This coat of arms was derived from a colored drawing from 1593 that would later, in 1933, dictate the colors of the municipal flag.

Asperger

The name of physician Hans Asperger indicates his having had a family connection to Asperg, though the man himself was born and lived in Austria. Thus, the well-known Asperger syndrome is indirectly named for the city.

References

External links

  (in German)

Ludwigsburg (district)